Qaraqocalı or Karagodzhaly or Karagadzhaly may refer to:
 Qaraqocalı, Kurdamir, Azerbaijan
 Qaraqocalı, Shamkir, Azerbaijan